The Zambia national futsal team is controlled by the Football Association of Zambia, the governing body for futsal in Zambia and represents the country in international futsal competitions.

Tournaments

FIFA Futsal World Cup
 1989 – Did not enter
 1992 – Did not enter
 1996 – Did not enter
 2000 – Did not enter
 2004 – Did not enter
 2008 – Did not qualify
 2012 – Did not qualify
 2016 – Did not qualify
 2020 – Did not qualify

Africa Futsal Cup of Nations
 1996 – Did not enter
 2000 – Did not enter
 2004 – Did not enter
 2008 – Round 1
 2011 – Cancelled
 2016 – 4th place

Grand Prix de Futsal
 2005 – Did not enter
 2006 – Did not enter
 2007 – Did not enter
 2008 – Did not enter
 2009 – Did not enter
 2010 – 15th place
 2011 – 14th place
 2013 – Did not enter
 2014 – Did not enter
 2015 – 8th place
 2016 – TBD

References

External links
Zambian Football Association
Official Zambian Futsal Website

Zambia
Futsal
Futsal in Zambia